Md Isa Sabu (born 24 August 1946) was the seventh Chief Minister of the Malaysian state of Perlis, in office from 2008 to 2013. He is a member of the United Malays National Organisation (UMNO). He held the state assembly seat of Bintong, in the Perlis capital of Kangar, until his retirement from politics in 2013.

Md Isa was sworn in as Chief Minister of Perlis on 17 March 2008 following the 2008 Malaysian election. The Raja of Perlis appointed Md Isa despite Perlis UMNO leader Shahidan Kassim having a letter of appointment from Prime Minister Abdullah Ahmad Badawi. Md Isa claimed the support of eight of his fellow UMNO assemblymen, satisfying the Raja that he could command the support of a majority of the 15-member Perlis state assembly. He did not re-contest his seat in the 2013 election, citing his age (67). He was replaced as Chief Minister by Azlan Man.

Md Isa is married with seven children. He was member of the federal parliament for Kangar from 1995 to 1999.

Honours
  :
  Knight Commander of the Order of the Crown of Perlis (DPMP) – Dato' (2002)
  Knight Grand Commander of the Order of the Crown of Perlis (SPMP) – Dato' Seri (2008)

References

Chief Ministers of Perlis
1946 births
United Malays National Organisation politicians
Living people
People from Perlis
Malaysian people of Malay descent
Malaysian Muslims
Members of the Dewan Rakyat
Members of the Perlis State Legislative Assembly
Perlis state executive councillors